Howard ministry may refer to:
 First Howard ministry
 Second Howard ministry
 Third Howard ministry
 Fourth Howard ministry